"Superstar" is the 17th episode of season four of the television series Buffy the Vampire Slayer. In this episode, Buffy and the other Scoobies must escape an alternate reality where Jonathan, a geeky and formerly unpopular boy, is famous and admired by everyone.

Plot
When Buffy and the gang discover a nest of vampires, they turn to Jonathan Levinson, a former fellow pupil of Sunnydale High School, for help. At Giles' apartment, Jonathan examines weapons and practices hand-to-hand combat with Buffy. Willow uses her computer to find a way to attack the vampire nest, but Jonathan finds a better way. He slays the majority of the vampires, leaving Buffy, who allowed one vampire to get past her, feeling inadequate. As they leave the crypt, Jonathan poses for pictures. He senses Spike's presence just before he emerges from the shadows. Buffy is at a loss for her usual witty puns, but Jonathan steps in to knock Spike's confidence down.

While putting pictures of Jonathan up on a wall, Willow and Tara talk about the fight earlier that night and Buffy's damaged relationship with Riley. At Riley's dorm room, Buffy tries to play basketball, but she is too uncomfortable around him to let him get close. Jonathan comforts Buffy and he tells her that she is mad at Riley because he does not know her as well as she would like him to. He tries to convince her to forgive Riley because her expectations are too high. All the while, Jonathan signs autographs for overzealous fans.

Colonel George Haviland is the new commander at the Initiative and has brought in Jonathan as a tactical consultant, leaving Jonathan to explain the plans to find and destroy Adam. Jonathan is aware Adam has a uranium power source. One fan, Karen, is spying on Jonathan's house, but is attacked by a demon and manages to run away. Jonathan counsels Riley about his relationship with Buffy, then shoots at apples atop of the heads of Initiative operatives, while blindfolded.

When Jonathan takes center stage as a singer at the Bronze, Buffy and Riley take to the dance floor. As Jonathan plays the trumpet, Xander and Anya are inspired to go somewhere to have sex. Buffy tells Riley that she wants to move on with their relationship. Karen goes to the Bronze for Jonathan, and, when she is taken back to his place, describes the demon's appearance. Jonathan acts strangely when she draws a symbol she saw on the demon, which he dismisses as a harmless monster. Buffy seems unsure of Jonathan's dismissive response.

Adam realizes that something is wrong with the world, and that Jonathan is not supposed to be popular. When twin blond girls call for Jonathan to come to bed, he drops his robe to reveal a symbol on his shoulder that matches the symbol Karen drew. On Tara's way to her dorm room, the demon attacks her. She chants a spell and escapes with her life. The next morning, Tara identifies the demon by the symbol on its head, and Buffy has even more reason to question Jonathan.

Buffy stops by Xander's house, and finds Anya and plenty of things on Jonathan. Buffy questions how Jonathan could be so perfect. He is credited for all the great things that have happened in the world (starring in The Matrix, inventing the internet etc.). Following Buffy's lead at Riley's encouragement, they look at Jonathan's swimsuit calendar to see the monster's mark on Jonathan's shoulder. Jonathan arrives and explains that he has a history with the monster and every time he faces it, he is overcome by confusion. Buffy and Jonathan get information on the demon's location from Spike. Willow discovers that Jonathan did an augmentation spell that would make everyone adore him, but that the spell had the side-effect of creating a demon to balance out the positive changes to Jonathan's life. If the demon is destroyed, the spell is reversed. The gang has a hard time dealing with the prospect of a world without Jonathan.

In a cave, Jonathan tries to prevent Buffy from falling into a pit, but the demon interrupts them. Jonathan hides while Buffy fights the demon, then runs out and pushes the demon into the pit, nearly falling in himself but being saved by Buffy. With the demon destroyed, the world returns to normal, and Jonathan is once again unpopular. Jonathan explains that when he received counseling after his attempted suicide, another man informed him about the augmentation spell, except for the demon.

Broadcast and Reception

"Superstar" was first broadcast on the WB on April 4, 2000. It received a Nielson rating of 2.8 on its original airing.

Noel Murray of The A.V. Club gave the episode a mixed review, stating, "So many big and small details are different in Jonathan’s version of reality, and yet the significant elements of the season-long story arc are still in play. In my head, I can make sense of all this, but I still can’t help thinking that “Superstar” would’ve been better if it had been a true standalone episode, with no link to the main storyline."

A review from the BBC website was positive, stating, "Superstar feels like Buffy's fourth season cruising in top gear... It's a great idea, immaculately executed, which is full of the usual witty in-jokes."

External links 

 
 "Superstar" at BuffyGuide.com

References

Buffy the Vampire Slayer (season 4) episodes
2000 American television episodes
Television episodes written by Jane Espenson